The 2020 Minnesota Republican presidential primary took place on March 3, 2020, as one of 14 contests scheduled for Super Tuesday in the Republican Party primaries for the 2020 presidential election.

Results

Results by county

Notes

References

Republican primary
Minnesota Republican primary
Minnesota Republican primary
Minnesota Republican caucuses